Jean-Paul Duminy (born 14 April 1984), more commonly known as JP Duminy, is a South African cricket commentator, and former international cricketer. He was vice-captain of the South Africa Twenty20 team. He is a left-handed batsman and a right-arm off spin bowler. Duminy, who is a Cape Coloured, was raised in the Western Cape and played domestic cricket for his home team, the Cape Cobras.

In September 2017, Duminy retired from Test cricket after playing 46 matches between 2008 and 2017. In May 2019, Duminy announced his retirement from domestic cricket  and in July 2019, he retired from all forms of international cricket.

Early career

Duminy is a successful batsman generally occupying the top order, a skilled fielder and a useful change bowler. He became known during the South African under-19s tour to England in 2003 and in the 2003–04 domestic season, where he averaged over 72, two years after breaking into South Africa's Western Province side. Though he bowls less frequently in One Day Internationals, he has also found success with the ball, making his ODI debut in 2004 against Sri Lanka.

International career
Replacing injured vice-captain Ashwell Prince, Duminy made his Test debut against Australia at the WACA in Perth on 17 December 2008, scoring 50* in the second innings and putting on an unbroken century partnership with AB de Villiers. His performance was lauded by numerous critics, including Peter Roebuck. In the next Test match, Duminy combined with the tailenders to score his maiden Test century, making 166 runs. South Africa were more than 200 runs in arrears when they lost their seventh wicket in the first innings. In the process, he and Dale Steyn put on an partnership of 180 and surpassed Graeme and Peter Pollock's South African ninth wicket partnership record against Australia. South Africa ended with a 62-run lead and converted it into a nine-wicket win. This sealed the series, the first time that South Africa had won a Test series in Australia, and Australia's first home Test series loss in 16 years. He also took his first Test wicket in the 3rd Test of the same tour.

During 2011 ICC Cricket World Cup, Duminy became the second batsman after Adam Gilchrist to be dismissed for 99 in a World Cup match. During 2015 ICC Cricket World Cup, Duminy became the first South African to take a hat-trick in a World Cup match. He dismissed Angelo Mathews with the last ball of an over, then dismissed Nuwan Kulasekara and Tharindu Kaushal with the first two balls of his next over. In that World Cup, he along with David Miller set the record for the highest fifth wicket partnership in ODI history when the pair scored 256 runs in an unbeaten partnership.
On 5 November 2016, Duminy scored his fifth Test century during the first Test against Australia at Perth, in a partnership of 250 runs with Dean Elgar, at the time, the second highest partnership for South Africa against Australia.

In October 2017, Faf du Plessis suffered an injury during the third ODI against Bangladesh and ruled him out of the T20I series. Duminy replaced him as T20I captain for that series.

In April 2019, Duminy was named in South Africa's squad for the 2019 Cricket World Cup. Duminy retired from international cricket after playing his team's last group stage match against Australia.

Domestic and T20 franchise career
Duminy played in the Indian Premier League in 2009 after the Mumbai Indians franchise acquired him for US$950,000. He scored two half-centuries in the tournament. Duminy went on to play for Sunrisers Hyderabad and Deccan Chargers and was named the captain of Delhi Daredevils in 2015. He was bought back by Mumbai Indians for the 2018 season and later released ahead of the 2019 IPL auction.

He also played in the Pakistan Super League in 2018 for Islamabad United whom he captained to the league title. He captained Winnipeg Hawks to the 2019 Global T20 Canada title, with Duminy named Player of the Tournament during which he was the leading run scorer. His final T20 tournament was the 2019 Caribbean Premier League when he played for Barbados Tridents.

Personal life 
Duminy is married to Sue with whom he has two daughters. He is a Christian, and returned to religion in 2013 during an international tour of Sri Lanka.

References

External links

 
 JP Duminy 's profile page on Wisden
 
 Interview and coaching video

1984 births
Living people
Cricketers from Cape Town
South Africa Test cricketers
South Africa One Day International cricketers
South Africa Twenty20 International cricketers
South African cricketers
Cape Cobras cricketers
Cape Coloureds
Devon cricketers
Western Province cricketers
Sunrisers Hyderabad cricketers
Mumbai Indians cricketers
Deccan Chargers cricketers
Islamabad United cricketers
Cricketers at the 2011 Cricket World Cup
Cricketers at the 2015 Cricket World Cup
Cricketers at the 2019 Cricket World Cup
One Day International hat-trick takers
South African Christians